Cleiton Pedro Guimarães (born 17 August 1992), simply known as Cleiton, is a Brazilian footballer who plays for Caldense. Mainly a midfielder, he can also play as a left back.

Club career
Born in São Paulo, Cleiton joined São Paulo's youth setup in 2010, aged 17, after starting it out at Paraná. In 2012, he moved to Palmeiras, and made his debuts as a senior for the latter's reserve team.

In August 2013 Cleiton moved to Mirassol, appearing with the club in Copa Paulista. He moved to Clube Atlético Diadema in the following year, scoring one goal in three appearances.

On 5 January 2015 Cleiton signed for Portuguesa, freshly relegated to Série C, and was presented on the 27th. He made his debut for the club on 4 February, coming on as a second half substitute for Filipi Souza in a 2–2 home draw against São Bento for the Campeonato Paulista championship.

On 23 September 2015 Cleiton joined Caldense, after rescinding with Lusa.

Career statistics
(Correct )

References

External links
Talents Sports profile 

1992 births
Living people
Footballers from São Paulo
Brazilian footballers
Association football defenders
Association football midfielders
Campeonato Brasileiro Série C players
Campeonato Brasileiro Série D players
Mirassol Futebol Clube players
Associação Portuguesa de Desportos players
Associação Atlética Caldense players